Luis Jesús Pérez Maqueda (born 4 February 1995) is a Spanish professional footballer who plays for Real Valladolid as a right-back.

Club career

Sevilla C
Born in Utrera, Seville, Andalusia, Pérez finished his graduation with Sevilla FC, and made his senior debut with the C-team in the 2014–15 season, in Tercera División. He also appeared with the reserves in Segunda División B during that campaign, featuring in two matches.

Jaén
On 12 July 2015, Pérez moved to fellow third-tier club Real Jaén, signing a one-year deal. After being an undisputed starter during the campaign

Elche
He signed for Segunda División side Elche CF on 11 July 2016.

Pérez made his professional debut on 3 September 2016, coming on as a second-half substitute for Javi Noblejas in a 3–1 home win against CD Tenerife. On 21 July of the following year, after suffering relegation, he signed a three-year contract with the latter club.

Valladolid
On 23 July 2020, Pérez signed a three-year deal with La Liga side Real Valladolid.

Career statistics

References

External links

1995 births
Living people
Spanish footballers
People from Utrera
Sportspeople from the Province of Seville
Footballers from Galicia (Spain)
Association football wingers
La Liga players
Segunda División players
Segunda División B players
Tercera División players
Sevilla FC C players
Sevilla Atlético players
Real Jaén footballers
Elche CF players
CD Tenerife players
Real Valladolid players